Topola  is a village in the administrative district of Gmina Skalbmierz, within Kazimierza County, Świętokrzyskie Voivodeship, in south-central Poland.

The village has a population of 1,100.

References

Topola